Preethi Nair (born 1971) is a British author of Indian heritage. Born in Kerala, India, she came to the United Kingdom as a child. She worked as a management consultant, but gave up her job to become a writer.

Preethi Nair's first novel, Gypsy Masala, was rejected by several publishers. She then set up her own publishing company and PR agency, Nine Fish, in Northampton, to publish and promote the book.

She created an alter ego, Pru Menon, in order to publicize the book, and went on to sign a three-book deal with HarperCollins.

Works 

Gypsy Masala
100 Shades of White
The Colour of Love / Beyond Indigo

References

External links
3:AM interview
Official Website

1971 births
Living people
21st-century British novelists
Malayali people
People from Kerala
British Hindus
British people of Indian descent